Lo que es el amor is a Mexican telenovela produced by Azteca in 2001 starring Claudia Ramirez and Leonardo Garcia. It is a remake of the Colombian television series Hombres.

Cast

References

Mexican telenovelas
2001 telenovelas
TV Azteca telenovelas
2001 Mexican television series debuts
2002 Mexican television series endings
Mexican television series based on Colombian television series
Spanish-language telenovelas